Gun Margareta Ädel (married Nilsson) (14 September 1938 – 10 August 2021) was a Swedish cross-country skier. She competed in the 1964 Winter Olympics in Innsbruck Austria.

Cross-country skiing results

Olympic Games

References

External links
 

1938 births
2021 deaths
Cross-country skiers at the 1964 Winter Olympics
Swedish female cross-country skiers
Olympic cross-country skiers of Sweden
Cross-country skiers from Gävleborg County
People from Bollnäs Municipality
20th-century Swedish women